Kelley James (born November 12, 1983) is an American singer-songwriter from Los Altos, California. James has toured nationally and played with acts such as OAR, the Goo Goo Dolls, and Weezer, as well as toured internationally in Australia. He is a regular performer at PGA Tour events including the Birds Nest at the Phoenix Open, Farmer's Insurance Rock Ball in San Diego, HP Byron Nelson Pavilion After Dark in Dallas, the NetJets Masters party in Augusta. James is a close friend of San Francisco Giants pitcher Barry Zito, and the two have shared the stage to perform together for Zito's Strikeouts for Troops charity.

Biography 
James was born in Los Altos, California and grew up in the Bay Area. He started playing music at the age of 12 after receiving his first guitar. James credits his childhood experiences in the Bay area as a strong musical influence due to the wide range of music to which he was exposed. His early interest in music was sparked by grunge artists like Nirvana, Sound Garden, and Pearl Jam, and his own music was inspired by singer-songwriter acts like Sublime, Ben Harper, Jason Mraz, and the Dave Matthews Band. California hip-hop served as inspiration that later led James to integrate freestyle rapping into music. James remains an independent artist and has financed his tours through sponsorship deals with brands like Oakley, Muscle Milk, Corona, and Honda.

Family 
James is married to Renee Herlocker and they have two children, son Camden and daughter Bowynn.

Discography 
 In A City That Has No Name (2007)
 The 15th St. EP (2008)
 Break Free (2009)
 From the Sand (2011)
 The Recent Future (2011)
 Summertime on My Mind (2012)
 The Pattern Transcending (2013)

References 

Living people
1983 births
People from Los Altos, California
Singers from California
21st-century American singers